Mohammad Ali Mustafa (born on October 29, 1989) is a Jordanian footballer who plays as a defender for Shabab Al-Ordon and the Jordan national football team.

Career 
He played his first international match with the Jordan national senior team against Nepal in a 2014 WC qualifying game in Kathmandu on 28 July 2011 when he entered as a substitute for his teammate Suleiman Al-Salman. The match ended in a 1–1 draw between the two teams.

References

External links 
 
  
 

1988 births
Association football midfielders
Jordanian footballers
Jordan international footballers
Living people
Jordanian expatriate footballers
Expatriate footballers in Qatar
Expatriate footballers in Bahrain
Expatriate footballers in Saudi Arabia
Jordanian expatriate sportspeople in Bahrain
Al-Wehdat SC players
Al-Jazeera (Jordan) players
Shabab Al-Ordon Club players
Al-Khor SC players
Al Kharaitiyat SC players
Al-Muharraq SC players
Al-Shoulla FC players
2015 AFC Asian Cup players
Footballers at the 2010 Asian Games
Sportspeople from Amman
Qatar Stars League players
Saudi Professional League players
Asian Games competitors for Jordan